Kyla Tucaya Garcia is an American stage, film, and television actress and audiobook narrator. As an audiobook narrator, she has received 14 Earphone Awards and has been a finalist for four Audie Awards.

Biography 
Garcia was born and raised in Hoboken, New Jersey and attended High Tech High School. She began acting at age 8 and at age 15, played Dorothy in an Off-Broadway production of Oz: A Twisted Musical. Shortly after, she began attending Mason Gross School of the Arts. She received a Bachelor of Fine Arts degree from Rutgers University.

, Garcia lives in Los Angeles.

Awards and honors

Awards

"Best of" lists

Filmography

References

External links 

 
 

Audiobook narrators
Living people
Actresses from New Jersey
People from Hoboken, New Jersey
Mason Gross School of the Arts alumni
Year of birth missing (living people)
21st-century American actresses